Meves's starling (Lamprotornis mevesii) or Meves's glossy-starling, is a species of starling in the family Sturnidae. It is found in Angola, Botswana, Malawi, Mozambique, Namibia, South Africa, Zambia, and Zimbabwe.

Its common name and Latin binomial commemorate the German ornithologist Friederich Wilhelm Meves.

Gallery

References

External links
 Meves's starling = Longtailed Starling - Species text in The Atlas of Southern African Birds.

Meves's starling
Birds of Southern Africa
Meves's starling
Taxa named by Johan August Wahlberg
Taxonomy articles created by Polbot